Kuo Fang-yu (born 1 April 1952) is a Taiwanese politician. He served as the Minister of Labor since 20 May 2016 until 7 February 2017.

Education
Kuo obtained his bachelor's and master's degrees in diplomacy from National Chengchi University in 1975 and 1979, respectively.

References

1952 births
Living people
National Chengchi University alumni
Taiwanese Ministers of Labor